George Beaumont (4 July 1904 – 19 October 1991) was a British rower. He competed in the men's coxed four event at the 1928 Summer Olympics.

References

External links
 

1904 births
1991 deaths
British male rowers
Olympic rowers of Great Britain
Rowers at the 1928 Summer Olympics
Sportspeople from Newark-on-Trent